Shah Mosque may refer to:

 Pamenar Mosque, Sabzevar
 Pamenar Mosque, Mehdishahr
Pamenar Mosque, Kerman